Luca Zanimacchia (born 19 July 1998) is an Italian professional footballer who plays as a right winger for  club Parma, on loan from Cremonese.

Club career
In August 2018, Zanimacchia was aggregated to Juventus U23 for the whole season. Zanimacchia made his debut for Juventus U23 in a 1–0 victory against Cuneo, in which he scored the first goal of Juventus U23's history. He made his Serie C debut for Juventus U23 on 16 September 2018 in a game against Alessandria. Juventus later redeemed the buying option of the player, after a good season where he had played 34 games and scored three goals. 

He made his Serie A debut, as well as his Juventus senior debut, in a 2–0 away defeat to Cagliari on 29 July 2020. On 1 September, he was loaned to the Spanish Segunda División side Real Zaragoza for the 2020–21 season, with a buyout clause.

On 9 July 2021 he joined Cremonese on loan. On 4 July 2022, he returned to the Cremona team on loan with an obligation to buy.

On 29 January 2023, Zanimacchi was loaned by Cremonese to Parma, with an option to buy and a buy-back option for Cremonese.

Career statistics

Honours 
Juventus U23
 Coppa Italia Serie C: 2019–20

Juventus
 Serie A: 2019–20

References

External links 
 
 

1998 births
People from Desio
Sportspeople from the Province of Monza e Brianza
Footballers from Lombardy
Living people
Italian footballers
Association football forwards
Serie A players
Serie B players
Serie C players
Serie D players
Segunda División players
Genoa C.F.C. players
Juventus Next Gen players
Juventus F.C. players
Real Zaragoza players
U.S. Cremonese players
Parma Calcio 1913 players
Italy youth international footballers
Italian expatriate footballers
Italian expatriate sportspeople in Spain
Expatriate footballers in Spain